The Jitong-Tongliao Railway is a  railway in Inner Mongolia, China, that opened in 1995. Its starting point is at Jining and ends at Tongliao. The Jitong Railway is a joint venture between China Railway and the government of Inner Mongolia.
Since Inner Mongolia was one of the poorer provinces of China in the early 1990s, the line was built with an eye towards reducing startup costs, with the intention of upgrading at a future date as funds became available.  The tracks were built to a high engineering standard, featuring heavy rail, concrete crossties, and extensive use of tunnels and viaducts to reduce grades.  In contrast, lower-cost anachronistic technologies were intentionally selected for cases where it was possible to upgrade incrementally: semaphore signaling, manned crossing gates, and steam engines.

World's last mainline steam train service
Due to low labor costs and plentiful coal, China was one of the last countries to retire steam locomotives on mainline services.  As dieselisation and electrification progressed in the early 1990s, China Railways found itself with a large stock of surplus steam locomotives, some built as recently as the late 1980s.  The government of Inner Mongolia was thus able to acquire steam engines at a low cost for use on the Jitong Railway. The line's proximity to coal mines also allowed fuel to be procured locally, resulting in reduced operating costs.

The Jitong Railway was the last mainline railway in the world to use steam locomotives. All of these locomotives were the large 2-10-2 QJ type engines and often trains had 2 locomotives on their head end. On December 8, 2005, the world's last regular mainline steam train finished its journey, marking the end of steam era. The steam locomotives were replaced by the DF4 diesel locomotives.

Two QJ steam locomotives, 6988 and 7081, were delivered to United States for use on the Iowa Interstate Railroad. They have run many excursions including one with ex Milwaukee Road 261, a 4-8-4 Northern. This was the first triple headed main line steam train in the USA since the 1991 tripleheader that utilized Southern Railway 4501, Norfolk and Western 611, and Norfolk and Western 1218 to celebrate the 25th anniversary of the Norfolk Southern steam program, which had started on the Southern Railway (U.S.) in 1966 with the then newly rebuilt 4501 as the only operating locomotive in the program. One QJ steam locomotive, 7040, was also delivered to the United States for use on the R.J. Corman Railroad Group; It has been numbered 2008 since beginning service in the United States.

Electrification
Electrification of the railway began in April 2020. The project is expected to take four years.

See also

Rail transport in the People's Republic of China
Rail transport in Inner Mongolia
List of railways in China

External links
 Detailed descriptions of the line, its depots and tractive power during the steam locomotive time
 International Herald Tribune report
 Pictures from the JiTong railway, while still under steam operation

References

Railway lines in China
Rail transport in Inner Mongolia
Transport in Inner Mongolia
Railway lines opened in 1995